The Church of Sant Romà is an 11th-century Lombard Romanesque church that originally stood in the town of Sant Romà de Sau, which is now the municipality of Vilanova de Sau, Catalonia, Spain. The church was consecrated in 1062. It was damaged by a 15th-century earthquake and was renovated and enlarged.

The church and town were submerged by the Sau reservoir when a dam was built on the Ter River in the 1960s as part of the large-scale dam-building campaign of the Francisco Franco regime. In periods of drought, the entire Church of Sant Romà can be visible, whereas usually only the tip of its bell tower can be seen out of the water.

See also 
 List of submerged places in Spain

References

External links 

 Gallery()

Roma
Submerged places